The Louis Armstrong House is a historic house museum at 34-56 107th Street in the Corona neighborhood of Queens in New York City. It was the home of Louis Armstrong and his wife Lucille Wilson from 1943 until his death in 1971.  Lucille gave ownership of it to the city of New York in order to create a museum focused on her husband.

The house was designated a New York City Landmark in 1988 and declared a National Historic Landmark in 1976. It now serves as a museum that presents concerts and educational programs, and makes materials in its archives of writings, books, recordings and memorabilia available to the public for research.

Background 
The Louis Armstrong Educational Foundation gave the house to the Department of Culture Affairs after Lucille Armstrong died in 1983. This beautiful brick house was designed by architect Robert W. Johnson and built by Thomas Daly in 1910. Some changes were made to the exterior and interior of the house when the Armstrongs moved in. The porch that was once in the front of the house was taken down and the space was added to the living room. For the exterior of the house the garden was assembled and the garage was constructed by the Armstrongs.

In addition the interior of the house was renovated to their taste. Ornate bathrooms, and the kitchen was not originally part of the house. Paintings and souvenirs were given to Louis Armstrong on tour from Asia, Europe to Africa. These gifts have found a home of their own on dressers, night stands, shelves and walls.

Museum 

The New York City Landmarks Preservation Commission held a hearing in November 1985 about whether to designated the Louis Armstrong House as a Landmark. At the hearing, a letter and a statement were read in support of the designation, and five witnesses spoke in favor. The house was designated as an individual landmark on December 13, 1988.

See also
 List of music museums
John Coltrane Home
List of New York City Designated Landmarks in Queens
National Register of Historic Places listings in Queens County, New York

References

External links

African-American museums in New York City
Armstrong
Corona, Queens
Historic house museums in New York City
Houses completed in 1910
Houses on the National Register of Historic Places in Queens, New York
Jazz organizations
Louis Armstrong
Museums in Queens, New York
Music museums in New York (state)
National Historic Landmarks in New York City
New York City Designated Landmarks in Queens, New York
Jazz in New York City
African-American historic house museums